The 2020–21 Loyola Ramblers men's basketball team represented Loyola University Chicago during the 2020–21 NCAA Division I men's basketball season. The Ramblers, led by 10th-year head coach Porter Moser, played their home games at the Joseph J. Gentile Arena in Chicago, Illinois as members of the Missouri Valley Conference. They finished the season 26–5, 16–2 in MVC play to win the regular season championship. They defeated Southern Illinois, Illinois State, and Drake to win the MVC tournament championship. As a result, they received the conference's automatic bid to the NCAA tournament as a No. 8 seed in the Midwest region. There they defeated No. 9-seeded Georgia Tech and upset No. 1-seeded Illinois to advance to the Sweet Sixteen. In the Sweet Sixteen, they lost to Oregon State.

On April 3, 2021, Moser left Loyola to accept the head coaching position at Oklahoma. A few days later, the school announced that assistant coach Drew Valentine would take over as the Ramblers' head coach.

Previous season
The Ramblers finished the 2019–20 season 21–11, 13–5 in MVC play to finish in second place. They lost in the quarterfinals of the MVC tournament to Valparaiso. All postseason play was canceled due to the ongoing COVID-19 pandemic.

Offseason

Departures

Incoming transfers

2020 recruiting class

Roster

Schedule and results

|-
!colspan=9 style=| Regular season

|-
!colspan=12 style=| MVC tournament

|-
!colspan=12 style=| NCAA tournament

Rankings

*AP does not release post-NCAA Tournament rankings^Coaches did not release a Week 1 poll.

References

Loyola
Loyola Ramblers men's basketball seasons
Loyola Ramblers men
Loyola Ramblers men
2020 in Illinois
2020s in Chicago
Loyola